Black Market International (BMI) is a performance artist collective with international members, each with an established and independent practice as a solo performer. Since 1985 the group has presented durational collective performances worldwide.

The movement was founded under the name Market project in 1985 in Poznan (Poland) with founders Boris Nieslony, Zygmunt Piotrowski, Tomas Ruller and Jürgen Fritz. In 1986 for the first European tour the name Black Market was taken. In 1990/91 the group appeared as Black Market International, with personal changes .

There have been a variety of different versions of what BMI is about, as the group always avoided the definition of an organised group. The title Black Market does not designate a group, but rather an idea of working. The aim is to promote - like in a black market - open and free exchange of ideas, and to achieve an Art of Encounter, or  mixed englisch-german “Art of Begegnung”.

Members 
Until 2014, the group had twelve regular members: 
 Jürgen Fritz, Germany
 Norbert Klassen, Switzerland (died in 2011)
 Miriam Laplante, Canada/Italy
 Alastair MacLennan, UK
 Helge Meyer, Germany
 Boris Nieslony, Germany
 Jacques Maria van Poppel, Netherlands
 Elvira Santamaria, Mexico
 Marco Teubner, Germany
 Julie Andree T., Canada
 Roi Vaara, Finland
 Lee Wen, Singapore.

Past Black Market International members were:
 Zygmunt Piotrowski, Poland
 Tomas Ruller, Czech Republic
 Nigel Rolfe, Ireland
 Zbigniew Warpechowski, Poland. 
Several international guest artists have been invited to collaborate in BMI performances throughout the years.

See also
 Performance art
 Fluxus
 Experimental theatre 
 Living theatre
 Intermedia
 Norbert Klassen
 Alastair MacLennan
 Lee Wen
 List of performance artists

References

External links
 Official website of Black Market International 
 Timeline of Black Market International history and activities on the website of ASA Art Service Association
 Michael LaChance, Performance Art Research. “15 principles of Black Market International"
 About BMI on member Boris Nieslony’s official website
 About BMI on member Myriam Laplante’s official website
 About BMI on member Lee Wen’s official website

German performance artists
Swiss performance artists
Performance artist collectives